The 1997 South Florida Bulls football team represented the University of South Florida (USF) in the 1997 NCAA Division I-AA football season, and was the first team fielded by the school. The Bulls were led by head coach Jim Leavitt, played their home games at Houlihan's Stadium in Tampa, Florida and competed as a Division I-AA Independent. The Bulls finished their inaugural season with a record of five wins and six losses (5–6).

Schedule

References

South Florida
South Florida Bulls football seasons
South Florida Bulls football